Ropica tongae is a species of beetle in the family Cerambycidae. It was described by Breuning in 1973.

References

tongae
Beetles described in 1973